Kalupur is a central area in Ahmedabad, the financial centre of Gujarat, India.

Geography

Location

Kalupur is the central part of Ahmedabad city. Kalupur Bus Station runs buses to all major destinations in Ahmedabad city. The station is operated by Ahmedabad Municipal Transport Service (AMTS).

Ahmedabad's main central railway station is also at Kalupur.

Places of interest
Shri Swaminarayan Temple, Ahmedabad is a delightful shrine situated at Kalupur. This is the first temple of the Shri Swaminarayan Sampraday. The temple enshrines images of Lord Narnarayandev, Lord Radhakrishna Dev, Lord Dharmadev-BhaktiMata, Lord Harikrishna Maharaj, Lord Ghanshyam Maharaj and Lord Balswaroop Ghanshyam Maharaj.

References

External links
 About Swaminarayan Temple

Neighbourhoods in Ahmedabad